Alberto Moncayo Bernal (born 23 July 1991) is a Grand Prix motorcycle racer from Spain.

Career

Early career
Born in Cadiz, Moncayo began competitive racing at a young age and won his first championship at the age of eleven, winning the Valencian minimoto championship before winning the championship of Andalucia the following season. Moncayo then moved up to 125cc level in 2005, competing in the Catalan championship, where he would finish eleventh in the 2005 championship and improved to finish runner-up in 2006. He moved up to the CEV Buckler 125GP series in 2007 where he would compete for three full seasons, ending up with the championship in 2009 with three victories at Valencia, Albacete and Catalunya.

125cc World Championship

Moncayo moved into the 125cc World Championship full-time ahead of the  season, partnering Danny Webb at the Andalucia Cajasol team. A fifth place, and three further top ten finishes helped Moncayo to finish in 13th place in the final championship standings.

Career statistics

By season

By class

Races by year
(key)

References

External links

 Andalucia Cajasol profile 

125cc World Championship riders
Spanish motorcycle racers
1991 births
Living people
Moto3 World Championship riders
Moto2 World Championship riders